Dwaraka Tirumala mandal is one of the 28 mandals in Eluru district of the Indian state of Andhra Pradesh. It is under the administration of Eluru revenue division and the headquarters are located at Dwaraka Tirumala. The mandal is bounded by Jangareddygudem, Koyyalagudem, Kamavarapukota, Nallajerla, Pedavegi, Unguturu, Denduluru and Bhimadole mandals.

Demographics 

 census, the mandal had a population of 68,989 with 19,180 households. The total population constitute, 34,797 males and 34,192 females —a sex ratio of 983 females per 1000 males. 7,260 children are in the age group of 0–6 years, of which 3,642 are boys and 3,618 are girls. The literacy rate stands at 61.41 with 42,364 literates.

Government and politics 
Dwaraka Tirumala mandal is one of the 4 mandals under Gopalapuram (SC) (Assembly constituency), which in turn represents Rajahmundry (Lok Sabha constituency) of Andhra Pradesh.

Towns and villages 

 census of India, the mandal has 35 settlements, which includes 1 towns and 34 villages. Dwaraka tirumala (C.T.) is the only town.

The settlements in the mandal are listed below:

Notes
(CT) denotes a Census town
(†) Mandal headquarter

References

Mandals in Eluru district